Serampore (also called Serampur, Srirampur, Srirampore, Shreerampur, Shreerampore, Shrirampur or Shrirampore) is a city of Hooghly district in the Indian state of West Bengal. It is the headquarter of the Srirampore subdivision. It is a part of the area covered by Kolkata Metropolitan Development Authority (KMDA) and Greater Kolkata. It is a pre-colonial city on the west bank of the Hooghly River. It was part of Danish India under the name Frederiknagore from 1755 to 1845.

Geography

Location

The area consists of flat alluvial plains, that form a part of the Gangetic Delta. This belt is highly industrialised.

Police stations
Serampore police station has jurisdiction over Serampore and Baidyabati Municipal areas, and parts of Sreerampur Uttarpara CD Block. Serampore Women police station has been set up.

Urbanisation
Srirampore subdivision is the most urbanized of the subdivisions in Hooghly district. 73.13% of the population in the subdivision is urban and 26.88% is rural. The subdivision has 6 municipalities and 34 census towns. The municipalities are: Dankuni Municipality, Uttarpara Kotrung Municipality, Konnagar Municipality, Rishra Municipality, Serampore Municipality and Baidyabati Municipality. Amongst the CD Blocks in the subdivision, Uttarapara Serampore (census towns shown in the map alongside) had 76% urban population, Chanditala I 42%, Chanditala II 69% and Jangipara 7% (census towns in the last 3 CD Blocks are shown in a separate map). All places marked in the map are linked in the larger full screen map.

Climate

Demographics 
According to an India census, Serampore had a population of 181,842 in 2011. Males constituted 51.55% of the population and females 48.45%. It had an average literacy rate of 88.73%, higher than the national average of 74.04%: male literacy was 92.75% and female literacy 87.05%; 7% of the population was under 6 years of age.

Kolkata Urban Agglomeration
The following Municipalities and Census Towns in Hooghly district were part of Kolkata Urban Agglomeration in 2011 census: Bansberia (M), Hugli-Chinsurah (M), Bara Khejuria (Out Growth), Shankhanagar (CT), Amodghata (CT), Chak Bansberia (CT), Naldanga (CT), Kodalia (CT), Kulihanda (CT), Simla (CT), Dharmapur (CT), Bhadreswar (M), Champdani (M), Chandannagar (M Corp.), Baidyabati (M), Serampore (M), Rishra (M), Rishra (CT), Bamunari (CT), Dakshin Rajyadharpur (CT), Nabagram Colony (CT), Konnagar (M), Uttarpara Kotrung (M), Raghunathpur (PS-Dankuni) (CT), Kanaipur (CT) and Keota (CT).

Education 
 Serampore College
Pearl Rosary School - Mahesh ( WBBSE, WBCHSE)
 Government College of Engineering and Textile Technology
 Serampore Union Institution
 Serampore Girls' College
 Mahesh Sri Ramkrishna Ashram Vidyalaya (Higher Secondary)
 Serampore Girl's High School (Akna Girl's High School)
 Chatra Nandalal Institution
 Serampore Mission Girls High School
 Malina Lahiri Boy's Academy
 Holy Home School
 West Point Academy
 Gospel Home school

 Pearl Rosary school (West Chatra) 
 Kidzee
 Bangla High School
 Ballavpur High School
 Mahesh high School
 Mahesh Banga Vidyalaya
 Ramesh Chandra Girl's High School
 Rajyadharpur Netaji Uchcha Balika Vidyalaya
 Parameshwari Girl's High School
 Nabagram K D Paul Vidyalaya
 Chatra Bani Balika Vidyalaya
 Anjuman.n.c.l.project School
 Aurobindo N.c.l.p School
 Bharati Balika Pry. School
 Fatema Girls Jr. High School
 Gopinath Saha Pry. School
 Mission Girls High School
 Nayabasti Sree Shiva Jr High School
 Saraswati.n.c.l.p Special School
 Viswanath Vidyamandir
 Prabash Nagar G.s.f.p.
 Mallickpara Municipal Free Pry

See also 

 Rathayatra of Mahesh
 Srerampur (Lok Sabha constituency)
 Sreerampur (Vidhan Sabha constituency)
 Serampore College
 Senate of Serampore College (University)
 Serampore Town Railway Station
 Srirampore subdivision
 Serampore Mission Press
 Hannah Marshman
 William Carey 
 Joshua Marshman 
 Willam Ward
 Serampore Trio
 Sheoraphuli Raj Debuttar Estate
 Sheoraphuli
 Sheoraphuli railway station

References

External links 
 JNNURM of West Bengal
 WorldStatesmen- India
 Rotary Club of Serampore

 
Cities and towns in Hooghly district
Danish India
Former Danish colonies
Neighbourhoods in Kolkata
Kolkata Metropolitan Area